The Iron Maiden Tour was a 1980 concert tour by Iron Maiden in support of their eponymous debut album. The band's first solo headlining tour, it followed the co-headlined Metal for Muthas Tour from earlier in the same year. The tour commenced with a British leg from 1 April to 23 August, although this included one concert in Finland, before the band supported Kiss on their Unmasked Tour from 24 August to 16 October, immediately following which guitarist Dennis Stratton was sacked and replaced with Adrian Smith. After Smith was hired, the band decided to undertake another British tour, taking place from 21 November to 21 December.

The tour would see them perform in mainland Europe for the first time, as well as record their first live video at the Rainbow Theatre, London, on the last night of the tour.

Setlist
The setlist for supporting shows consisted of:
 "The Ides of March" (Intro) (from Killers, 1981)
 "Sanctuary" (from Iron Maiden, 1980)
 "Prowler" (from Iron Maiden, 1980)
 "Remember Tomorrow" (from Iron Maiden, 1980)
 "Running Free" (from Iron Maiden, 1980)
 "Transylvania" (from Iron Maiden, 1980)
 "Phantom of the Opera" (from Iron Maiden, 1980)
 "Iron Maiden" (from Iron Maiden, 1980)
 "Drifter" (from Killers, 1981)
While headlining shows had a setlist of: 
 "The Ides of March" (Intro)  (from Killers, 1981)
 "Sanctuary" (from Iron Maiden, 1980)
 "Prowler" (from Iron Maiden, 1980)
 "Wrathchild" (from Killers, 1981)
 "Remember Tomorrow" (from Iron Maiden, 1980)
 "Charlotte the Harlot" (from Iron Maiden, 1980)
 "Killers" (from Killers, 1981)
 "Another Life" (from Killers, 1981)
 Drum solo
 "Transylvania" (from Iron Maiden, 1980)
 Guitar solo
 "Strange World" (from Iron Maiden, 1980)
 "Innocent Exile" (from Killers, 1981)
 "Phantom of the Opera" (from Iron Maiden, 1980)
 "Iron Maiden" (from Iron Maiden, 1980)
 "Running Free" (from Iron Maiden, 1980)
 "Drifter" (from Killers, 1981)
 "I've Got the Fire" (Montrose cover)
Notes:
 All songs played from Killers were unreleased at this time.
 "Women in Uniform" (Skyhooks cover) was performed on 25 November 1980.
 "Invasion"  (from "Women in Uniform", 1980) was performed on 19 July 1980.

Tour dates

Reference

Festivals and other miscellaneous performances
This concert was in support of Judas Priest
This concert was a part of Wheel Pop Festival
This concert was a part of Kuusrock Festival
This concert was a part of Reading Festival
This concert was in support of Kiss
This concert was a part of Open Air Festival

Cancellations
 24 August 1980: Lisbon, Portugal, Cascais Hall
 25 August 1980: Lisbon, Portugal, Cascais Hall
 30 August 1980: Perugia, Italy, Stadio Comunale
 31 August 1980: Bologna, Italy, Stadio Renato Dall'Ara
 29 November 1980: Sheffield, England, University of Sheffield; (Paul Di'Anno's throat infection)

See also
List of Iron Maiden concert tours

References

Sources

External links

 Official website
 Iron Maiden Tour Dates

1980 concert tours
1980 in British music
Concert tours of Belgium
Concert tours of Denmark
Concert tours of Finland
Concert tours of France
Concert tours of Germany
Concert tours of Italy
Concert tours of Norway
Concert tours of Sweden
Concert tours of Switzerland
Concert tours of the Netherlands
Concert tours of the United Kingdom
Iron Maiden concert tours